Echinopepon racemosus is a species of flowering plant in the genus Echinopepon, native to Latin America. A vine, its densely echinate fruits are dehiscent, but not explosive.

References

Cucurbitoideae
Plants described in 1978